Albert Owen "Ab" Wright (November 16, 1905 – May 23, 1995) was a professional baseball outfielder and a National Football League running back. He went to college at Oklahoma State University, then played for the Frankford Yellow Jackets in the NFL in 1930. He then played two seasons in Major League Baseball, one for the Cleveland Indians in 1935, and one for the Boston Braves in 1944. He had an extensive minor league baseball career, lasting from 1928 until 1946.

External links

Ab Wright at Pro-Football-Reference

1905 births
1995 deaths
Major League Baseball outfielders
Cleveland Indians players
Boston Braves players
American football running backs
Frankford Yellow Jackets players
Dayton Aviators players
Joplin Miners players
Shawnee Robins players
Muskogee Chiefs players
Minneapolis Millers (baseball) players
Des Moines Demons players
Greensboro Patriots players
Danville Veterans players
Little Rock Travelers players
Baltimore Orioles (IL) players
Montreal Royals players
Buffalo Bisons (minor league) players
Oklahoma City Indians players
Muskogee Reds players
Oklahoma State Cowboys baseball players
Oklahoma State Cowboys football players
Baseball players from Oklahoma
Players of American football from Oklahoma